Huerfano County High School, at 415 Walsen Ave. in Walsenburg, Colorado, was built in 1920.  It was designed in Late Gothic Revival style by architect Isaac Rapp.  It has also been known as Walsenburg Middle School and denoted as 5HF.2183.  It was listed on the National Register of Historic Places in 2005.

Current use
The building now houses the Walsenburg branch library of the Spanish Peaks Library District.

References 

School buildings completed in 1920
Buildings and structures in Huerfano County, Colorado
Gothic Revival architecture in Colorado
School buildings on the National Register of Historic Places in Colorado
National Register of Historic Places in Huerfano County, Colorado
1920 establishments in Colorado